Yoo Hye-ri is a South Korean actress and model. She is known for her roles in dramas such as Golden Pouch, Sweet Home, Sweet Honey and You're Only Mine.

Personal life
She was married to actor Lee Geun-hee in 1994. She met him when they were performing together in theater. They divorced in 1998. She and her younger sister Choi Su-rin are both actresses.

Filmography

Television

Film

Awards and nominations
 1990 28th Daejong Awards Film Festival Best Actress

References

External links 
 
 

Living people
1964 births
South Korean female models
South Korean film actresses
South Korean television actresses